Treichelia is a genus of plants in the Campanulaceae. It contains two known species, both endemic to Cape Province of South Africa.

 Treichelia dodii Cupido
 Treichelia longibracteata (H.Buek) Vatke

References

Campanuloideae
Campanulaceae genera
Flora of South Africa